Dark Touch is a 2013 Irish-French-Swedish supernatural horror film that was directed and written by Marina de Van. The film had its world premiere on 18 April 2013 at the Tribeca Film Festival and stars Missy Keating as the sole survivor of a bloody massacre that caused the deaths of her family.

Synopsis 
Eleven-year-old Niamh (Missy Keating) and her family live in an extremely small and isolated community in Ireland where her only contact with other people comes in the form of school and her neighbors Nat (Marcella Plunkett) and Lucas (Pádraic Delaney). She claims that their house is coming alive but when Nat and Lucas discover Niamh bruised and bloody, her parents say that Niamh herself is causing the destruction. Niamh is later discovered as the sole survivor of an extremely violent attack that killed everyone else in the house. She tells the police that the house is responsible for her parents' deaths and for her infant brother's suffocation in her arms, but the police attribute the massacre to vandals. Niamh's neighbors decide to take her in and try to help soothe her pain, but they soon find that whatever caused the problems in Niamh's old house are now beginning to present themselves in their home.

Cast 
Missy Keating as Niamh
Marcella Plunkett as Nat Galin
Pádraic Delaney as Lucas Galin
Charlotte Flyvholm as Tanya Collins
Stephen Wall as Mathew Collins
Ella Hayes as Emily
Robert Donnelly as Ryan Galin
Susie Power as Lucy Galin
Richard Dormer as Henry
Catherine Walker as Maud
Simon Boyle as Mr. Brennan
Olga Wehrly as Colette
Mark Huberman as Joseph
Katie Kirby as Lisbeth
Clare Barrett as Christine
Art Parkinson as Peter

Reception 
Critical reception for Dark Touch has been mostly positive and the film holds a rating of 73% on Rotten Tomatoes (based on 11 reviews) and 64 on Metacritic (based on 5 reviews).

Awards 
Denis-de-Rougemont Youth Award at the Neuchâtel International Fantastic Film Festival (2013, won)
Mad Movies Award at the Neuchâtel International Fantastic Film Festival (2013, won)
Narcisse Award for Best Feature Film at the Neuchâtel International Fantastic Film Festival (2013, won)
Maria Award for Best Motion Picture at the Sitges - Catalan International Film Festival (2013, nominated)

References

External links 

2013 films
2013 horror films
2010s supernatural horror films
Irish supernatural horror films
English-language Irish films
English-language French films
English-language Swedish films
2010s English-language films